Bobby Henderson is an American physics graduate, known for being the founder of Pastafarianism.

Early life and education
Henderson was born in 1980 in Oregon. He studied physics at Oregon State University.

Pastafarianism

In 2005, Henderson founded the religion of Pastafarianism in response to the Kansas State Board of Education's decision to teach intelligent design alongside evolution in schools. He requested that "Pastafarianism" be taught alongside intelligent design and "logical conjecture based on overwhelming observable evidence". After his protest letter to the board was ignored, he posted it online and the beliefs quickly gained traction.

In 2006, he wrote The Gospel of the Flying Spaghetti Monster, a book detailing the core beliefs of the religion.

In 2019 Henderson repeated his belief that religion should be kept out of government schools and money kept out of religion. He emphasized that although he is the founder of Pastafarianism, he is not the creator of the religion. The creator is the Flying Spaghetti Monster.

References

American parodists
1980 births
Flying Spaghetti Monster
Living people
21st-century American physicists
Religion in the United States
Religious parodies and satires
Writers about religion and science
People from Roseburg, Oregon